The C88 was a prototype family car designed for the Chinese market in 1994 by Porsche in response to the Chinese government's invitation to a number of international automotive manufacturers for a new range of cars.  It was completed in four months by Porsche engineers and was displayed to the public at the 1994 Beijing Auto Show. The prototype is now on display in the Porsche Museum in Stuttgart, Germany. 

The four-door compact sedan body was unlike any other Porsche, and did not feature the Porsche badge anywhere. It was designed with only one child seat--reflecting Chinese population control policy--and the prototype was presented by CEO Wendelin Wiedeking himself, who learned his speech in Mandarin.  According to Porsche Museum director Dieter Landenberger, "The Chinese government said thank you very much and took the ideas for free, and if you look at Chinese cars now, you can see many details of our C88 in them."

The C88 was intended to broaden the market for Porsche designs to India, where it was also unsuccessful. Porsche has more recently engineered small cars for a range of manufacturers--including the Audi RS2, Lada Samara and SEAT Ibiza.

References

External links

Official Porsche Engineering website

C88